John Henry "Herm" Doscher, Sr. (December 20, 1852 – March 20, 1934) was an American third baseman and umpire in the early years of professional baseball, playing for five different teams in the National Association and National League from  though . He also served as a regular umpire in both early major leagues, the NL (1880–81) and American Association (1887–88, 1890). His son Jack was a major league pitcher for several years, mainly for the Brooklyn Superbas. Jack Doscher was the first son of a major leaguer to also play in the majors.

Playing career
Born in New York City, Doscher began his playing career in the National Association with the  Brooklyn Atlantics as a right fielder. He only played in six games that year, but batted .360, and played in only one game in the  season, also in Brooklyn. He didn't hit very well, and was only able to play in the minor leagues for the next few seasons.

Mistaken expulsion and reinstatement
In 1882, he accepted a temporary job as a scout with Cleveland, even though he had signed a contract with the Detroit Wolverines for the  season. The Cleveland directors had him expelled from the league for "embezzelment and obtaining money under false pretense". It was later proven in NYC court that the original contract was never signed by Detroit, voiding the original contract.

Umpiring career
Known as a colorful, but a no-nonsense, hardline player, he was a natural to the umpiring profession. Once quoted as saying "I've got to play ring master, school teacher, poppa and momma, and doctor in every game", he would use any tactic he could to control the game, even physical force if necessary.

He was involved in two no-hitters; one occurred on August 19, when he was the umpire for Larry Corcoran's no-hitter, just the fourth no-hitter thrown in the major leagues. The other was Adonis Terry's no-hitter on May 27, Terry's second career no-hitter.

On September 21, with the Rochester Broncos at the St. Louis Browns in the second game of a doubleheader, and St. Louis leading 10–3 in the eighth inning, Doscher ejected Rochester's Sandy Griffin for arguing and called an end to game, giving the victory to St. Louis because Griffin refused to leave the field. It was Doscher's only forfeit on record as an umpire.

Later years
Doscher's occupations in subsequent years include work as a scout; the discovery of future Hall of Famer Willie Keeler is attributed to him. Doscher died in Buffalo, New York at the age of 81, and was interred at Elmlawn Cemetery in Tonawanda, New York.

References

External links

Retrosheet

1852 births
1934 deaths
Major League Baseball third basemen
19th-century baseball players
Brooklyn Atlantics players
Washington Nationals (NA) players
Troy Trojans players
Chicago White Stockings players
Cleveland Blues (NL) players
Baseball players from New York City
Major League Baseball umpires
London Tecumseh players
Binghamton Bingos players